Julia Foster (born 2 August 1943) is an English stage, screen, and television actress.

Life and career
Foster was born in Lewes, Sussex. Her first husband was Lionel Morton, once the lead singer with the 1960s pop band The Four Pennies. She is the mother of television celebrity Ben Fogle with her second husband, veterinarian Bruce Fogle. Foster also built up her own antique furniture business.

Foster's credits include the films The Loneliness of the Long Distance Runner (1962), The System (1964) with Oliver Reed, The Bargee (1964) with Harry H. Corbett, Alfie (1966) with Michael Caine, Half a Sixpence (1967) with Tommy Steele, and Percy (1971) with Hywel Bennett.

On television, in 1969, she appeared in the second episode of series 1 of the Doctor in the House for London Weekend Television. She also starred as the eponymous heroine in the BBC production of Moll Flanders (1975) and also appeared alongside John Stride in the Yorkshire Television series Wilde Alliance in 1978. Additionally, she appeared with Michael Winner in a British TV advert for Esure car insurance.

She played Queen Margaret of Anjou in the BBC Television Shakespeare adaptations of Henry VI, Part 1, Henry VI, Part 2, and The Tragedy of Richard III, which received its UK broadcast in January 1983.

After her stage debut with the Brighton Repertory Theatre, Foster made her London debut in Travelling Light in 1965 at the Prince of Wales Theatre; she has since appeared in several London stage productions, including at The Globe Theatre, Lyric Theatre (Hammersmith), Queens Theatre, Criterion Theatre, King's Head Theatre, Royal Court Theatre, Apollo Theatre, New End Theatre, also in the UK at the Nottingham Playhouse, New Theatre, Oxford, Birmingham Repertory Company, and the Citizens Theatre, Glasgow.

In 1967, Foster appeared on Juke Box Jury, in 1971 Call My Bluff, and in 1976, she was the castaway on Desert Island Discs.

In 2020, she played Vilma in Orphan 55, the third episode of series 12 of Doctor Who.

Selected filmography
 Term of Trial (1962)
 The Loneliness of the Long Distance Runner (1962)
 The Small World of Sammy Lee (1963)
 Two Left Feet (1963)
 The Bargee (1964)
 The System (1964)
 One Way Pendulum (1964)
 Alfie (1966) 
 Ride of the Valkyrie (1967)
 Half a Sixpence (1968)
 Simon, Simon (1970)
 Percy (1971)
 The Great McGonagall (1974)
 All Coppers Are... (1972)
 Flick (2008)
 Dad's Army (2016) – Dolly Godfrey

Selected television
 Emergency Ward 10 (1961)
 Your World (1961)
 Taxi! (1963)
 They Throw It at You, Armchair Theatre, (1964)
 The Villains (1964) 
 The Public Eye (1965)
 The Seven Deadly Sins (1966)
 The Sex Game (1968)
 Doctor in the House (1969)
 Good Girl (1974)
 Mr Axelford’s Angel, ITV Playhouse (1974).
 Masquerade (1974)
 Moll Flanders (1975)
 F. Scott Fitzgerald in Hollywood (1975)
 Wilde Alliance (1978)
 Jukes of Piccadilly (1980)
 Hammer House of Horror (1980)
 Tragedy of Richard III, The (1983)
 King Henry VI (1983)
 The Cabbage Patch (1983)
 Late Starter (1985)
 News at Twelve (1988)
 Casualty (1992)
 Holby City (2001/2019)

Selected stage appearances
 What the Butler Saw Queens Theatre, London (1969).
 Flint, Criterion Theatre, London.(1970).
 Lulu, Nottingham Playhouse and Royal Court Theatre, London (1970).
 The Day after the Fair, Lyric Theatre, Hammersmith, London (1972)
Notes on a Love Affair, Globe Theatre, London. (1972).
 St Joan, New Theatre Oxford (1974)
 The Singular Life of Albert Nobbs, New End Theatre, London. (1978).
Happy Birthday, Apollo Theatre, London (1979).
Country Wife, Citizens Theatre, Glasgow, 1979, then Lyric Theatre, Hammersmith, London (1980).
After You with the Milk, with the Birmingham Repertory Company, UK. (1980).
 Time and the Conways, Chichester Festival Theatre (1983)
 The Women, Old Vic, London and Yvonne Arnaud Theatre, Guildford, Surrey. (1986), (1987)
 Preserving Mr. Panmure, Chichester Festival Theatre (1991)
 The Rise and Fall of Little Voice, Bristol Old Vic. (1993 – 1994)
 Allelujah!, Bridge Theatre (2018)

References

External links

1943 births
Living people
English film actresses
People from Lewes
20th-century English actresses
21st-century English actresses
English television actresses
Actresses from Sussex
English stage actresses